Billy Blind (also known as Billy Blin, Billy Blynde, Billie Blin, or Belly Blin) is an English and Lowland Scottish household spirit, much like a brownie.  He appears only in ballads, where he frequently advises the characters. It is possible that the character of Billy Blind is a folk memory of the god Woden or Odin from Germanic mythology, in his "more playful aspect"  and is speculated to have been the same character as Blind Harie, the "blind man of the game" in Scotland.

Child Ballads
In Child Ballad no 5c, Gil Brenton, it is Billy Blind that advises the hero that his bride is not the woman beside him, who is a virgin, but she is hiding in her bower and already pregnant.

In Child Ballad no 6, Willie's Lady, Willie's wife has been in labour and can not deliver because Willie's mother, a rank witch, is preventing her.  Billy Blind advises Willie to make a wax figure of a baby and invite his mother to the christening.  In her rage, the mother demands to know how all her magic was undone, listing all the things she's done, and Willie is able to undo them.

In Child Ballad no 53C, Young Bekie, he advises Burd Isobel that Young Bekie is about to marry another bride, and gives her assistance in the magical journey to reach him in time.

In Child Ballad no 110, The Knight and the Shepherd's Daughter, he appears in many of the variants to reveal the true births of the marrying couple:  much higher than was apparent.

Modern literature
In modern fantasy, Billy Blind appears in Peter S. Beagle's Tamsin, where his main characteristic is to give advice.

References

External links
Young Bekie (third version)

Northumbrian folklore
Northumbrian folkloric beings
Ballads
English legendary creatures
English folklore
Scottish folklore
Odin
Household deities